is a military base of the Japan Ground Self-Defense Force, located in Gotemba, Shizuoka prefecture, Japan. It is one of several military facilities located in the foothills of Mount Fuji, and is located across a road from the United States Marine Corps Camp Fuji.

History
Camp Takigahara was established in 1908 by the Imperial Japanese Army as a training facility. After the end of World War II, it came under the control of the United States Army in Japan, and was renamed “North Camp”. The US Army turned over half of North Camp to the United States Marine Corps in 1953, with the other half (across the street from present-day Camp Fuji) was eventually turned over the Japan Ground Self-Defense Force as the Takigahara Garrison.

In 1974, Takigaha was elevated to the status of a full base, and reestablished as a training facility for the post-war Ground Japan Self-Defense Force. Camp Takigahara oversees operations of the large joint-use East Fuji Maneuver Area. 

Units from Camp Takigahara cooperated in the filming of the 2001 movie Godzilla, Mothra and King Ghidorah: Giant Monsters All-Out Attack.

Organization
 JGSDF Fuji School (Combined Training)
 Infantry School Regiment (Mechanized)
Fuji Training School
 JGSDF Training Evaluation Unit

External links
Official home page

Takigahara
Takigahara
Military installations established in 1908
1908 establishments in Japan
Gotemba, Shizuoka